Zosima Davydov (12 September 1963 – 9 May 2010) was the Russian Orthodox bishop of Yakutsk and Lensk, Russia.

Born as Igor Vasilyevich Davydov (Игорь Васильевич Давыдов) he received his monastic tonsure on 16 December 1991, aged 28. He was ordained as a bishop on 27 September 2004.

He died in 2010, aged 46, from a heart attack.

References 

1963 births
2010 deaths
Bishops of the Russian Orthodox Church
People from Yakutsk